Several vessels have been named Calypso for the figure from Greek mythology.

 Calypso was a snow of 47 tons (bm), built in Dublin in 1792. On 21 June 1796 she sailed, probably from Liverpool, as a slave ship in the triangular trade in enslaved people. "Renau's squadron" captured her on the Windward Coast of Africa; her master ransomed her. She then completed her voyage, arriving at Barbados on 1 June 1797 with 79 slaves. She then disappears from online records.
 Calypso, of 190 tons (bm), was built in Bermuda in 1795. The Sierra Leone Company purchased her circa 1796 to support their settlement in Sierra Leone. A French privateer under Spanish colours captured Calypso, Cole, master, in February 1798 as Calypso was going down the Gold Coast from Sierra Leone.
  is a former British Royal Navy minesweeper converted into a research vessel for the oceanographic researcher Jacques Cousteau, equipped with a mobile laboratory for underwater field research. She was severely damaged in 1996 and was planned to undergo a complete refurbishment in 2009–2011.

See also
  – any one of nine vessels of the Royal Navy

Citations

Ship names